Piattoli is a surname. Notable people with the surname include:

 Anna Bacherini Piattoli (1720–1788), Italian painter
 Gaetano Piattoli (1703–c. 1770), Italian painter
 Giuseppe Piattoli the Younger (1748-1834), Italian painter and engraver
 Scipione Piattoli (1749–1809), Italian Catholic priest